The 1974–75 2. Bundesliga season was the inaugural season of the 2. Bundesliga, the second tier of the German football league system. It was played in two regional divisions, Nord and Süd.

Hannover 96, Bayer 05 Uerdingen and Karlsruher SC were promoted to the Bundesliga while Olympia Wilhelmshaven, Rot-Weiß Oberhausen, VfL Wolfsburg, HSV Barmbek-Uhlenhorst, VfR Heilbronn, Borussia Neunkirchen, VfR Wormatia Worms and VfR Mannheim were relegated to the Oberligas and Amateurligas.

Nord

League table
For the 1974–75 season saw no team promoted to the new 2. Bundesliga from the Amateurligas while Hannover 96 and SC Fortuna Köln had been relegated to the 2. Bundesliga Nord from the Bundesliga.

Results

Top scorers
The league's top scorers:

Süd

League table
For the 1974–75 season saw no team promoted to the new 2. Bundesliga from the Amateurligas and no team relegated to the 2. Bundesliga Süd from the Bundesliga.

Results

Top scorers
The league's top scorers:

Promotion play-offs
The second placed teams of each division entered a two-leg promotion play-off. Bayer Uerdingen was promoted to Bundesliga.

References

External links
 2. Bundesliga 1974/1975 Nord at Weltfussball.de 
 2. Bundesliga 1974/1975 Süd at Weltfussball.de 
 1974–75 2. Bundesliga at kicker.de 

1974-75
2
German